Daniil Alekseyevich Zorin (born 22 February 2004) is a Russian footballer who plays as a midfielder for Spartak Moscow.

Club career
Zorin made his debut for Spartak Moscow on 19 October 2022 in a Russian Cup game against Fakel Voronezh. He made his Russian Premier League debut for Spartak on 23 October 2022 against FC Khimki.

Career statistics

References

External links
 
 
 
 

Living people
2004 births
Russian footballers
Footballers from Moscow
Association football midfielders
Russia youth international footballers
Russian Premier League players
FC Spartak Moscow players